A combined authority is a type of local government institution introduced in England outside Greater London by the Local Democracy, Economic Development and Construction Act 2009. Combined authorities are created voluntarily and allow a group of local authorities to pool appropriate responsibility and receive certain delegated functions from central government in order to deliver transport and economic policy more effectively over a wider area.

Combined authorities are created in areas where they are considered likely to improve transport, economic development, and regeneration. There are currently ten such authorities, with the Greater Manchester Combined Authority established on 1 April 2011, four others established in April 2014, two in 2016, two more in 2017 and one in 2018.

History 

Following the abolition of metropolitan county councils and the Greater London Council in 1986, England had no local government bodies with strategic authority over the major urban areas of the country. In 1999, following a successful referendum, the Labour government created a strategic authority for London (the Greater London Authority), but no bodies were established to replace the metropolitan county councils outside London. The Blair government instead pursued the idea of elected Regional Assemblies, although following an unsuccessful referendum in 2004 in the most positive region – the North East – this idea had few proponents.

In October 2010 the Coalition Government introduced measures to replace Regional Development Agencies, which were described as inefficient and costly. They were superseded by local enterprise partnerships, voluntary groups whose membership was drawn from the private sector with local authority input.

Earlier in 2010 the Government accepted a proposal from the Association of Greater Manchester Authorities to establish a Greater Manchester Combined Authority as an indirectly elected top-tier strategic authority for Greater Manchester.

Following the unsuccessful English mayoral referendums in 2012, combined authorities have been used as an alternative means to grant additional powers and funding as part of 'city deals'. In 2014, two indirectly elected combined authorities were established covering the ceremonial county areas of South Yorkshire and West Yorkshire, and a further two which each covered a metropolitan county and adjacent non-metropolitan districts: the Liverpool City Region Combined Authority for Merseyside and the Borough of Halton unitary authority, and the North East Combined Authority for Tyne and Wear and the unitary authorities of County Durham and Northumberland.

In 2016 a combined authority was formed for the metropolitan county of the West Midlands; as a consequence, all former metropolitan counties are now covered by combined authorities. In 2016, the first combined authority to not cover a metropolitan county was formed. This was Tees Valley, which covers the area of the former county of Cleveland (now four unitary authorities in the ceremonial counties of Durham and North Yorkshire), together with the unitary authority of Darlington. Two further combined authorities which do not cover ceremonial counties or former metropolitan counties were formed in 2017: West of England, comprising Bristol and two of the three adjacent unitary authorities in Gloucestershire and Somerset, all of which had been within the former county of Avon; and Cambridgeshire and Peterborough.

In 2020 it was reported that other combined authorities for non-metropolitan parts of the country – such as Cumbria, Lancashire, North Yorkshire, and Somerset – were under consideration, but the effect of the coronavirus pandemic on governance meant decisions were delayed until late 2021.

Legislation 

The Local Democracy, Economic Development and Construction Act 2009 allowed for certain functions over transport to be delegated from central government. The Localism Act 2011 allowed additional transfers of powers from the Secretary of State for Communities and Local Government and gave combined authorities a general power of competence. The powers and functions to be shared are agreed by the metropolitan district, non-metropolitan district, non-metropolitan county or unitary authority councils.

In 2014 the government consulted on changes to the legislation governing combined authorities. Proposed changes included extending the legislation to Greater London, Wales, and Scotland. The Cities and Local Government Devolution Act 2016 received royal assent on 28 January 2016. The act allowed for the introduction of directly elected mayors to combined authorities in England and Wales with powers over housing, transport, planning, and policing.

In 2020 the government planned to produce a white paper on 'Devolution and Local Recovery', which was expected to create new combined authorities with mayors - or "county mayors" - for non-metropolitan areas of the country. These have tentatively suggested to be a 'Great South West' grouping of Cornwall, Devon, and Dorset (possibly with Somerset), and another in Lancashire. The white paper was delayed and was eventually published on 2 February 2022.

Powers and functions 

The combined authority is a legally recognised entity, able to assume the role of an integrated transport authority and economic prosperity board. This gives the authority the power to exercise any function of its constituent councils that relates to economic development and regeneration, and any of the functions that are available to integrated transport authorities. For transport purposes, combined authorities are able to borrow money and can levy their constituent authorities.

Combined authorities were (until the United Kingdom left the European Union) encouraged to borrow from European institutions for social and environmental schemes which met EU objectives. Loans were made with conditions attached which further EU policies. By 2015, Greater Manchester CA had agreed loans from the European Investment Bank which topped £1 billion, with similar liabilities to the Treasury and private business.

Creation and amendment 

Combined authorities consist of two or more contiguous English local government areas. The creation of a combined authority is voluntary and all local authorities within the area must give their consent before it can be created. The local authority of any district of England outside Greater London can join a combined authority, and a county council can become part of a combined authority even if only some of the non-metropolitan districts that make up the county are within the combined authority area. A local authority may only belong to one combined authority.

There are three stages to the creation or amendment of a combined authority. Firstly a review must be undertaken to establish the likelihood that a combined authority would improve:  On completion of the review the local authorities produce and publish a proposed scheme of the combined authority to be created, including the area that will be covered, the constitution, and the functions. This will include details of membership of the authority, remuneration, and how meetings will be chaired and recorded. Following a period of consultation and subject to the approval of the Secretary of State for Communities and Local Government, the combined authority is formally created, dissolved, or altered by a statutory instrument.

Current combined authorities
Following the unsuccessful English mayoral referendums in 2012, combined authorities were encouraged as an alternative structure to receive additional powers and funding as part of 'city deals'.

Proposed combined authorities

Several additional combined authorities have been proposed. In 2022 a government white paper was published which included nine areas invited to take part in devolution deals.

See also 
 Greater London Authority (which operates under different legislation).
 History of local government in England
 Local government in England

References

External links
 House of Commons Library Briefing Paper, July 2017

 
Local government in England